Alexander Wykeham "Alex" Ellis CMG (born 5 June 1967) is a British civil servant, currently British High Commissioner to India. Previously,  he was Deputy National Security Adviser for the Integrated Review on diplomacy, development and defence. Ellis was previously the Director General of the Department for Exiting the EU. He had previously been Britain's ambassador to Brazil from July 2013 to January 2017.

Career
Ellis was educated at Dragon School, Oxford, Winchester College and Magdalene College, Cambridge. He taught history at St Edward's School, Oxford before joining the Foreign and Commonwealth Office (FCO) in 1990. He was British ambassador to Portugal 2007–10 and Director of Strategy at the FCO 2011–13 before being appointed ambassador to Brazil. In November 2016 it was announced that Ellis would become Director General at the Department for Exiting the European Union.

Ellis was appointed Companion of the Order of St Michael and St George (CMG) in the 2013 Queen's Birthday Honours.

References
ELLIS, Alexander Wykeham, Who's Who 2013, A & C Black, 2013; online edn, Oxford University Press, Dec 2012
Alex Ellis, British Ambassador to Brazil, British Embassy Brasilia

1967 births
Living people
People educated at The Dragon School
People educated at Winchester College
Alumni of Magdalene College, Cambridge
Ambassadors of the United Kingdom to Portugal
Ambassadors of the United Kingdom to Brazil
Companions of the Order of St Michael and St George
High Commissioners of the United Kingdom to India